The Wiley Rock Schoolhouse, at 603 Main St. in Wiley, Colorado, was listed on the National Register of Historic Places in 2004.

It was built in 1938 as a Works Progress Administration project.

It served as an annex to the high school and included space for agriculture classes, for a blacksmith shop, and a music room.

References

External links

Schools in Colorado
Blacksmith shops
National Register of Historic Places in Prowers County, Colorado